Paul Friedrich (15 September 1800 – 7 March 1842) ruled as Grand Duke of Mecklenburg-Schwerin from 1837 to 1842.

Biography
He was born in Ludwigslust the son of Friedrich Ludwig, Hereditary Grand Duke of Mecklenburg-Schwerin and Grand Duchess Elena Pavlovna of Russia, and was the only surviving grandchild of Paul I of Russia who was born during the Tsar's lifetime. Paul Friedrich was educated at Geneva, Jena and Rostock. Paul Friedrich became heir-apparent to the throne of Mecklenburg-Schwerin in 1819, upon the death of his father, the Hereditary Grand Duke.

On 1 February 1837 he succeeded his grandfather, Friedrich Franz I.  His reign saw improvements in the infrastructure and judicial system of the Grand Duchy, as well as a change in the government's seat of residence from Ludwigslust to Schwerin.  Nonetheless, Paul Friedrich was largely interested only in military matters and spent most of his time drilling his troops. As Paul Friedrich reached his middle age, he adopted a more reclusive lifestyle, preferring only the company of his mistress. Paul Friedrich died in 1842 of a cold caught while rushing to a fire in his capital city.

Marriage and children
Paul Friedrich married Princess Alexandrine of Prussia at Berlin on 25 May 1822. They had two sons and one daughter:
Friedrich Franz II (1823–1883)
Luise (1824–1859) married Hugo, Prince of Windisch-Grätz and had issue (Princess Marie of Windisch-Graetz)
Wilhelm (1827–1879) married Princess Alexandrine of Prussia, daughter of Prince Albert of Prussia

Paul Friedrich also had issue with his mistress, Countess Catarina Hauke, daughter of Johann Mauritz Hauke and sister of Princess Julia of Battenberg:
Catarina (1830–1834)
Paul Friedrich (1832–1903) married Countess Maria Anna van Nieppell, had issue
Alexander (1833–1833)
Helene Catarina  (1835–1915) died unmarried

Ancestors

References

External links

 

1800 births
1842 deaths
People from Ludwigslust
Grand Dukes of Mecklenburg-Schwerin
House of Mecklenburg-Schwerin
Protestant monarchs
German landowners
Burials at Schwerin Cathedral
Grand Crosses of the Order of Saint Stephen of Hungary